Murray "Dusty" Cohl,  (February 21, 1929 – January 11, 2008) was a Canadian film producer and co-founder of Toronto International Film Festival and Canada's Walk of Fame.

Murray Cohl was born in Toronto, Ontario to Karl and Lillian Cohl in 1929. His father Karl was a Communist who worked as a house painter in the city. Cohl attended at Charles G. Fraser elementary school and Camp Naivelt in Brampton northwest of Toronto from the age of five. He began his adult life as a real estate lawyer after graduating from Osgoode Hall Law School in 1954.

Cohl was invested into the Order of Canada in May 2003 for “his pride in Canadian talent” and his “desire to celebrate our achievements.” He was diagnosed with liver cancer in late 2007. On January 11, 2008, he died at a hospital in Toronto.

References

External links 
 

1929 births
2008 deaths
Film producers from Ontario
Deaths from liver cancer
People from Toronto
Members of the Order of Canada
Deaths from cancer in Ontario
Osgoode Hall Law School alumni
Film festival founders
Toronto International Film Festival people
Jewish Canadian filmmakers